Norman Reginald Jacobsen (3 January 1889 – 6 May 1950) was a New Zealand cricketer, hockey player, scientist, lawyer, teacher, political candidate and businessman.

Biography
Jacobsen was born in 1889 in Wellington. He was educated at Auckland Grammar School. He then studied at the University of Auckland where he graduated with a B.Sc. in 1911 and an M.Sc. in 1912. He did scientific research after he was offered a postgraduate research scholarship. He then studied law at the University of Auckland and later worked in a legal firm. Later he became a teacher and was second assistant at Hamilton High School and vice-principal at Napier Boys' High School.

He played five matches of first-class cricket for Hawke's Bay between 1919 and 1921. Subsequently, he was a member of the executive committees of the Hawke's Bay Cricket Association. He also represented Australia and New Zealand at hockey.

From 1931 to 1933 Jacobsen travelled the world, studying educational methods. He spent some time in the United States, mostly at Columbia University, and in India he spent some months teaching with the writer Rabindranath Tagore. In 1935 he travelled through New Zealand accompanying the touring Indian hockey team. 

He polled a distant third.

Jacobsen was appointed manager of the Wellington Sports Centre when it was opened in the mid-1940s. He still held the position when he died in May 1950 at his home in Wellington.

See also
 List of Hawke's Bay representative cricketers

References

1889 births
1950 deaths
Cricketers from Wellington City
People educated at Auckland Grammar School
University of Auckland alumni
New Zealand cricketers
Hawke's Bay cricketers
New Zealand male field hockey players
New Zealand Democrat Party (1934) politicians
Unsuccessful candidates in the 1935 New Zealand general election